Tyrosine-protein phosphatase non-receptor type 2 is an enzyme that in humans is encoded by the PTPN2 gene.

The protein encoded by this gene is a member of the protein tyrosine phosphatase (PTP) family. Members of the PTP family share a highly conserved catalytic motif, which is essential for the catalytic activity. PTPs are known to be signaling molecules that regulate a variety of cellular processes including cell growth, differentiation, mitotic cycle, and oncogenic transformation. 

Epidermal growth factor receptor and the adaptor protein Shc were reported to be substrates of this PTP, which suggested the roles in growth factor mediated cell signaling. Three alternatively spliced variants of this gene, which encode isoforms differing at their extreme C-termini, have been described. 

The different C-termini are thought to determine the substrate specificity, as well as the cellular localization of the isoforms. Two highly related but distinctly processed pseudogenes that localize to distinct chromosomes have been reported.

References

Further reading